The Tombs is the colloquial name for the Manhattan Detention Complex (formerly the Bernard B. Kerik Complex), a municipal jail in Lower Manhattan at 125 White Street, and also the nickname for three previous city-run jails in the former Five Points neighborhood of lower Manhattan, in an area now known as the Civic Center.

The original Tombs was officially known as the Halls of Justice, built in 1838 in an Egyptian Revival architectural style, similar in form to a mastaba. It may have been this style that caused it to be called 'the Tombs', although other theories exist. It was built as a replacement for the Colonial-era Bridewell Prison located in City Hall Park, built in 1735. The new structure incorporated material, mainly granite, from the demolished Bridewell to save money.

The four buildings known as The Tombs were, in sucession:
 1838–1902, New York City Halls of Justice and House of Detention
 1902–1941, City Prison
 1941–1974, Manhattan House of Detention
 1983–present, Manhattan Detention Complex (known as the Bernard B. Kerik Complex from 2001 to 2006)

History

Halls of Justice and House of Detention, 1838–1902 

The first complex to have the nickname was an Egyptian Revival design by John Haviland completed in 1838. There was a rumor at the time that the building was inspired by a picture of an Egyptian tomb that appeared in John Lloyd Stephens' Incidents of Travel in Egypt, although this appears to be untrue. The building was 253 feet, 3 inches in length and 200 feet, 5 inches wide, and it occupied a full block, surrounded by Centre Street, Franklin Street, Elm Street (today's Lafayette), and Leonard Street. It initially accommodated about 300 prisoners, and $250,000 was allocated in 1835 to build it, but various cost overruns occurred prior to completion of the project.

The building site had been created by filling in the Collect Pond that was the principal water source for Colonial New York City. Industrialization and population density by the late 18th century resulted in the severe pollution of the Collect, so it was condemned, drained, and filled in by 1817. The landfill job was poorly done, however, and the ground began to subside in less than 10 years. The resulting swampy, foul-smelling conditions transformed the neighborhood into a slum known as Five Points by the time that prison construction started in 1838. The heavy masonry of Haviland's design was built atop vertical piles of lashed hemlock tree trunks in a bid for stability, but the entire structure began to sink soon after it was opened. This damp foundation was primarily responsible for its unsanitary conditions in the decades that followed. Charles Dickens wrote about the jail in American Notes: "Such indecent and disgusting dungeons as these cells, would bring disgrace upon the most despotic empire in the world!"

The Tombs' formal title was The New York Halls of Justice and House of Detention, as it housed the city's courts, police, and detention facilities. It was a notable example of Egyptian Revival architecture, although opinion varied greatly concerning its actual merit. As Dickens wrote: "What is this dismal fronted pile of bastard Egyptian, like an enchanter's palace in a melodrama?"

The prison was well known for its corruption and was the scene of numerous scandals and escapes during its early history. A fire destroyed part of the building on November 18, 1842, the same day that a notorious killer named John C. Colt was due to be hanged. Apparently it was an escape attempt on Colt's part that failed, and he fatally stabbed himself in his cell. Convicted murderer and New York City politician William J. Sharkey earned national notoriety for escaping from the prison disguised as a woman on November 22, 1872. He was never captured and his fate is unknown.

Rebecca Salome Foster, a prison relief worker and missionary, became known as "the Tombs Angel" for her efforts to help and advocate on behalf of the many poor people held in squalid conditions at the Tombs. A monument to her, built in 1902 and put in storage in 1940, was rededicated in 2019 in the New York State Supreme Court's lobby.

City Prison, 1902–1941 

In 1902, the 1838 building was replaced by a million-dollar City Prison featuring an eight-story Châteauesque facade with conical towers along Centre Street, bounded by Centre Street, White Street, Elm Street (today's Lafayette), and Leonard Street.

The architects were Frederick Clarke Withers and Walter Dickson from Albany, who had been partners since the 1880s. This was their final major commission. In September 1900, the architects complained that construction would be delayed for a year and cost an additional $250,000 due to the unnecessary insertion of corrupt Tammany Hall architects Horgan and Slattery into the project.

The building was connected to the 1892 Manhattan Criminal Courts Building with a "Bridge of Sighs", crossing four stories above Franklin Street. There was also an Annex with another 144 cells that was finished in 1884.

Manhattan House of Detention, 1941–1974 
The 1902 prison was replaced in 1941 by a high-rise facility across the street on the east side of Centre Street. The 795,000 square foot Art Deco architecture facility was designed by architects Harvey Wiley Corbett and Charles B. Meyers.

The facility is the northernmost of the four 15-story towers of the New York City Criminal Courts Building at 100 Centre Street, bounded by Centre Street, White Street, Baxter Street, and Hogan Place. The three southern towers are wings of a single integrated structure sharing a five-story "crown" which house the city's Criminal and Supreme Courts, city offices, and various departments, including the headquarters of the Department of Corrections. The northern tower is freestanding, with the separate address of 125 White Street. It was officially named the Manhattan House of Detention for Men (MHD), although it was still referred to popularly as The Tombs.

By 1969, the Tombs ranked as the worst of the city's jails, both in overall conditions and in overcrowding. It held an average of 2,000 inmates in spaces designed for 925. Inmates rioted on August 10, 1970, after multiple warnings about falling budgets, aging facilities, and rising populations, and after an informational picket of City Hall by union correctional officers drawing attention to the pressures. Rioters took command of the entire ninth floor, and five officers were held hostage for eight hours, until state officials agreed to hear prisoner grievances and take no punitive action against the rioters. Despite that promise, Mayor John Lindsay had the primary troublemakers shipped upstate to the state's Attica Correctional Facility which likely contributed to the Attica Prison riot about a year later.

Within a month after the riot, the New York City Legal Aid Society filed a landmark class action suit on behalf of pre-trial detainees held in the Tombs. The city decided to close the Tombs on December 20, 1974, after years of litigation and after federal judge Morris E. Lasker agreed that the prison's conditions were so bad as to be unconstitutional. They shipped the remaining 400 inmates to Rikers Island, where conditions were not much better.

Manhattan Detention Complex, 1983–present 

Today, the Manhattan Detention Complex consists of a South Tower, the former Manhattan House of Detention remodeled and reopened in 1983, and a North Tower across White Street, completed in 1990. The complex still houses only male inmates, most of them pretrial detainees. The total capacity of the two buildings is nearly 900 people.

In the fall of 2020, the city planned to close the complex prior to the end of November 2020, according to an article in the New York Daily News.

The current jail was named The Bernard B. Kerik Complex in December 2001 at the direction of New York City mayor Rudolph Giuliani. Kerik was commissioner of the New York City Department of Corrections from 1998 to 2000 before becoming police commissioner. New York City mayor Michael Bloomberg ordered his name removed after he pleaded guilty to two misdemeanors in 2006, committed during his tenure as a city employee.

Notable people
 Edward Coleman, first criminal executed at the prison in 1839
 Rebecca Salome Foster, prison relief worker known as "The Tombs Angel"
 Ernestine Schaffner, prison relief worker known as "The Tombs Angel"
 Vojislav Stanimirović (crime boss) YACS
 William M. Tweed, head of the Tammany Hall political ring, spent a year in the Tombs after his second trial in 1873
 Morris U. Schappes, American educator, writer, radical political activist, historian, and magazine editor, incarcerated in the Tombs after a 1941 perjury conviction obtained in association with testimony before the Rapp-Coudert Committee (investigating Communism in education in New York)

In popular culture
Film

 The Tombs briefly appear in The Man From Beyond (1922) with Harry Houdini
The Tombs and the Bridge of Sighs appears in For the Defense (1930) with William Powell
 The Tombs appear in the 1947 film noir Kiss of Death.
 The film Short Eyes (1977) was filmed on location at The Tombs.
 The Tombs appear in the 2000 remake of Shaft.
 Towards the end of the movie American Gangster (2007), Denzel Washington's character, Frank Lucas, is seen leaving prison after a 15-year sentence. This scene was filmed at the Tombs, although in real life prisoners are held there for relatively brief stays (arraignments, trials, etc.).

Literature and plays

 In the James Baldwin novel If Beale Street Could Talk, Fonny is incarcerated in The Tombs after being falsely accused of rape.
William Burroughs refers to The Tombs in his semi-autobiographical book Junkie.
 As mentioned above, Charles Dickens disparaged The Tombs' architecture in American Notes (1842).
 In his autobiographical novel Memos from Purgatory, Harlan Ellison describes his brief incarceration in The Tombs following his arrest for possession of a firearm that he had used as a prop while lecturing.
 In the Wild Cards book series, edited by George R. R. Martin with assistance by Melinda Snodgrass, Jay Ackroyd often uses his wild card power to teleport his enemies to the Tombs.
 The Tombs is the setting for the endings of two works by Herman Melville: Pierre: or, The Ambiguities and Bartleby, the Scrivener. Bartleby, apparently by willful starvation, dies on the grassy ground of an open yard in the prison, prompting his former employer to famously exclaim, "Ah Bartleby! Ah humanity!"
 The Tombs is the setting of the play Short Eyes by Miguel Piñero and its film adaptation.
 The Tombs provides the setting for Harry Steeger's 1937 pulp fiction story "Dictator of the Damned", in which The Spider stages a daring raid to help exonerate an innocent man.
 Eric Carter, the main character of Richard Price's novel Lush Life, is incarcerated in the Tombs.
 In The Gilded Age: A Tale of Today, a novel by Mark Twain and Charles Dudley Warner published in 1873, the characters Laura Hawkins and Henry (Harry) Brierly are held in the Tombs after the former had shot a man dead in a New York hotel.
 Front de Liberation du Quebec member Pierre Vallieres wrote White Niggers of America while incarcerated in the Tombs for manslaughter.

Music
 Jim Carroll mentions in his song "People Who Died" that his friend Bobby committed suicide by hanging while in The Tombs. Carroll also mentions The Tombs in his song "Catholic Boy".
 Paul Simon's song "Me and Julio Down by the Schoolyard" includes a threat from the protagonist's father of being placed in the "House of Detention."
 With many elegiac songs about the Lower East Side, New York Hardcore band Agnostic Front has a song called "The Tombs" on their album One Voice.

Radio
 In November 2000, 16 people associated with the Opie and Anthony radio show were arrested and held in The Tombs overnight during a promotion for "The Voyeur Bus", a mostly glass bus carting topless women through Manhattan with a police escort.

Television

 In the TV sitcoms Night Court and Barney Miller, the officers frequently mention that they will take an arrestee to The Tombs.
 The Tombs are featured in season 1 of the 2012 historical drama Copper on BBC America.
 The TV dramas Blue Bloods, NYPD Blue, Law & Order, Law & Order: Special Victims Unit, and Castle regularly make references to The Tombs. In the SVU episode "Stranger", someone impersonating a long-missing daughter is sent to the Tombs, with the scene-change reading "MANHATTAN DETENTION COMPLEX" and the street address (125 WHITE STREET), as well as the usual inclusion of the calendar date.
 The short-lived comedy-drama The Unusuals mentioned the Tombs in several episodes.
 In the animated TV series Archer, the character Cyril mentions "spending the night in The Tombs, getting worked over by the cops" in the season 2 episode "Stage Two".
 In The Newsroom episode "Oh Shenandoah," Will McAvoy is held at the Manhattan Detention Complex as a result of his contempt citation.
 The Tombs also appears in the TV series The Night Of when the main character played by Riz Ahmed is sent there for murder.
 The Tombs are seen and referenced to in several episodes of the TV drama Kojak.
 During the second-season premiere of Crossing Lines, Detective Carl Hickman (played by William Fichtner) tells his nemesis Phillip Genovese (played by Kim Coates) that he will personally come back to New York to see Genovese take 'that last, long walk' to The Tombs.

References
Notes

Bibliography

Further reading

External links

 PrisonPro.com:  Manhattan Detention Complex
 New York Correction History Society timeline (includes photo)
 An early engraving by John Poppel
 John DePol etching of a later building, 1942
 Painting of 1842 fire at The Tombs
 "Irish in New York" site, Census of prisoners in 1860
 Article on the building complex at the website of the New York Correction History Society

Infrastructure completed in 1838
Government buildings completed in 1838
Infrastructure completed in 1902
Government buildings completed in 1902
Infrastructure completed in 1941
Government buildings completed in 1941
Prisons in New York City
Egyptian Revival architecture in the United States
Five Points, Manhattan
Jails in New York City
1838 establishments in New York (state)
Skyscrapers in Manhattan
Government buildings in Manhattan
John Haviland buildings
New York City Department of Correction